Mussurana quimi is a species of snake in the family Colubridae. The species is native to Brazil, Argentina, and Paraguay.

References

Mussuranas
Mussurana (genus)
Snakes of South America
Reptiles described in 1997
Reptiles of Brazil
Reptiles of Argentina
Reptiles of Paraguay